Robert Kosowski (born January 8, 1964) is a lobbyist and former politician from Michigan.

Career 
Kosowski is a former member of the Michigan House of Representatives from District 16, representing a district based in Westland, Michigan.

In 2019, Kosowski became a senior lobbyist at Capitol Strategies Group (CSG).

Personal life 
Kosowski's wife is Elizabeth. They have two sons. Kosowski is a former resident of Westland, Michigan. Kosowski and his family live in Holt, Michigan.

References

External links
 Robert Kosowski at ballotpedia.org
House Democrat profile on Kosowski
 A roundup of recent Michigan newspaper editorials (February 4, 2019)

1964 births
Living people
Politicians from Detroit
Democratic Party members of the Michigan House of Representatives
American lobbyists
People from Westland, Michigan
Place of birth missing (living people)
21st-century American politicians